Ellyse Gamble (born 16 September 1997) is an Australian rules footballer playing for Essendon in the AFL Women's competition. Gamble was drafted by the Western Bulldogs with their ninth selection and sixty-ninth overall in the 2016 AFL Women's draft. She made her debut in the thirty-two point win against  at VU Whitten Oval in the opening round of the 2017 season. She played six matches in her debut season. It was revealed that Gamble had signed a contract extension with the club on 16 June 2021, after playing 8 out 9 possible games for the club that season. Gamble achieved selection in Champion Data's 2021 AFLW All-Star stats team, after averaging the best in the league for one-on-one loss rate in the 2021 AFL Women's season, with a percentage of just 10.5 percent. In May 2022, Gamble joined expansion club Essendon.

Statistics
Statistics are correct to the end of the 2021 season.

|- style=background:#EAEAEA
| scope=row | 2017 ||  || 14
| 6 || 0 || 1 || 10 || 12 || 22 || 5 || 9 || 0.0 || 0.2 || 1.7 || 2.0 || 3.7 || 0.8 || 1.5 || 0
|-
| scope=row | 2018 ||  || 14
| 0 || – || – || – || – || – || – || – || – || – || – || – || – || – || – || 0
|- style=background:#EAEAEA
| scope=row | 2019 ||  || 14
| 3 || 0 || 0 || 8 || 3 || 11 || 4 || 6 || 0.0 || 0.0 || 2.7 || 1.0 || 3.7 || 1.3 || 2.0 || 0
|-
| scope=row | 2020 ||  || 14
| 4 || 0 || 0 || 16 || 7 || 23 || 7 || 7 || 0.0 || 0.0 || 4.0 || 1.8 || 5.8 || 1.8 || 1.8 || 0
|- style=background:#EAEAEA
| scope=row | 2021 ||  || 14
| 9 || 0 || 0 || 20 || 21 || 41 || 6 || 15 || 0.0 || 0.0 || 2.5 || 2.6 || 5.1 || 0.8 || 1.9 || 0
|- class=sortbottom
! colspan=3 | Career
! 21 !! 0 !! 1 !! 54 !! 43 !! 97 !! 22 !! 37 !! 0.0 !! 0.1 !! 2.6 !! 2.0 !! 4.6 !! 1.0 !! 1.8 !! 0
|}

References

External links 

1997 births
Living people
Western Bulldogs (AFLW) players
Australian rules footballers from Tasmania